Empire of Light is a 2022 British romantic drama film directed, written, and co-produced by Sam Mendes. Set in an English coastal town in the early 1980s, the film is about the power of human connection during turbulent times. It stars Olivia Colman, Micheal Ward, Monica Dolan, Tom Brooke, Tanya Moodie, Hannah Onslow, Crystal Clarke, Toby Jones, and Colin Firth.

The film had its world premiere at the 49th Telluride Film Festival on 3 September 2022, and was released by Searchlight Pictures through a limited theatrical release in the United States on 9 December 2022 and theatrically in the United Kingdom on 9 January 2023. Empire of Light received praise for Colman and Ward's performances and Roger Deakins's cinematography, but the screenplay was criticised. At the 80th Golden Globe Awards, the film was nominated for Best Actress in a Motion Picture – Drama for Colman, while Ward received a nomination for Best Actor in a Supporting Role at the 76th British Academy Film Awards. It also received a nomination for Best Cinematography at the 95th Academy Awards.

Plot
In 1980, Hilary Small works as a duty manager at the "Empire Cinema", Margate, on the north coast of Kent, England. Hilary struggles with bipolar disorder, lives alone, has been prescribed lithium by her GP, and is having extramarital sex with her boss Donald Ellis.

New employee Stephen, who is Black British and lives with his mother, Delia, a nurse, starts his new job at the cinema. Hilary is taken with the handsome and charming Stephen, and the two bond when she shows him the cinema's beautiful but disused upper floor.

Hilary becomes jealous when Stephen begins hanging out with Janine, a younger employee. While watching New Year's Eve fireworks from the cinema roof, Hilary impulsively kisses Stephen. The two of them begin a sexual relationship. Hilary cuts off Ellis and, happy about the new relationship, stops taking her medication.

Hilary sees Stephen be harassed by a group of skinheads on the street and later deal with a racist customer and Stephen confides in her about the racism he faces. Hilary and Stephen go to the beach, where Stephen tells her about his first love, Ruby, who works at the same hospital as his mother. When Stephen asks about her past, she goes on an agitated rant about men and angrily destroys a sand castle they had been building.

Neil, a coworker, discovers their relationship and warns Stephen of Hilary's mental health. Ellis informs the workers that the theater has been chosen for the regional premier of Chariots of Fire. At the premiere, a manic Hilary gets on stage and delivers an agitated speech before informing Ellis's wife about their affair.

Hilary's mental health deteriorates, and she is institutionalized. Stephen begins training with Norman, the theater's projectionist. He runs into Ruby at the theater, and they start dating again. Hilary is released from the hospital and returns to work. Stephen advises her to see a movie at the theater, something she has never done. During her welcome-back party, a skinhead crowd marches past the theater. When they see Stephen, they break in and assault him. Hilary accompanies him to the hospital, where she meets Stephen's mother.

As Stephen recuperates, Hilary initially stays away. Norman confides in her that he has a son he has not seen in many years because he abandoned his family and cautions her not to run away. She visits Stephen in the hospital. His mother tells Hilary that she makes Stephen happy. An overjoyed Hillary rushes back to the theater and has Norman play a movie for her: Being There.

Stephen returns to the theater but informs Hilary that, following her advice, he has decided to return to college and will be leaving town. Stephen remembers his times with Hilary at a going-away dinner with Ruby and his mother. The two meet in a park, where Hillary gives him a book and finally bids him goodbye.

As Stephen leaves on the train, he reads from the book: High Windows by Philip Larkin.

Cast
 Olivia Colman as Hilary Small
 Micheal Ward as Stephen Murray
 Colin Firth as Donald Ellis
 Toby Jones as Norman
 Tom Brooke as Neil
 Tanya Moodie as Delia Murray
 Hannah Onslow as Janine
 Crystal Clarke as Ruby
 Monica Dolan as Rosemary Bates
 Sara Stewart as Brenda Ellis
 Ron Cook as Mr Cooper
 Justin Edwards as Jim Booth
 Jamie Whitelaw as Sean

Production

It was announced in April 2021 that Sam Mendes had set his next film, which he would write and direct himself at Searchlight Pictures. Olivia Colman was in talks to star and Roger Deakins was announced as cinematographer. Colman was confirmed in July, with Micheal Ward also joining the cast. In December, Colin Firth, Toby Jones, Crystal Clarke and Tanya Moodie were added to the cast. Tom Brooke and Hannah Onslow were confirmed to star in late February. Trent Reznor and Atticus Ross composed the film's score.

Filming began on 7 February 2022 at Margate on the Isle of Thanet, Kent. The Dreamland Margate Cinema building was remodelled and renamed until 15 May 2022.

The film includes several pieces of music that are being played on a record player in the film, such as Bob Dylan's "It's Alright, Ma (I'm Only Bleeding)", Cat Stevens's "Morning Has Broken" and Joni Mitchell's "You Turn Me On, I'm a Radio".

Release
Empire of Light premiered at the Telluride Film Festival on 3 September 2022. It received a limited theatrical release by Searchlight Pictures in the United States on 9 December 2022 and was released theatrically in the United Kingdom on 9 January 2023.

The film was released for VOD on 7 February 2023, followed by a Blu-ray and DVD release on 21 February 2023.

Reception

Critical response

The film has received mixed reviews. On the review aggregator website Rotten Tomatoes, the film holds an approval rating of 45%, based on 233 reviews, with an average rating of 5.8/10. The site's critics consensus reads: "Empire of Light contains some fine performances and a few flashes of brilliance, but this tribute to the magic of cinema is disappointingly mundane." On Metacritic, the film has a weighted average score of 54 out of 100, based on 48 critics, indicating "mixed or average reviews". A more favourable review in The Guardian said the film was a "poignant, wonderfully acted drama".

Matt Zoller Seitz of RogerEbert.com, rating the film 2.5 out of 4 stars, wrote that it "starts out a bit dim and unfocused and becomes sharper and more illuminating as it unreels." He also praised Roger Deakins' cinematography and Olivia Colman's performance, but was more critical of the character of Stephen: "[H]e remains an abstraction for too long, to the point where it looks like the film is setting him up as more of a plot device (or sacrificial lamb) than a man. The movie trembles with intimations of impending doom for Stephen, and the dialogue mentions then-recent racial incidents. But [Sam] Mendes presents his anger, fear and distress with the same dissociated stare that freezes Hillary in her tracks when she sees skinheads tormenting Stephen on a sidewalk."

Accolades

References

Notes

External links
 
 Official screenplay
 
 

2022 films
2020s British films
2022 romantic drama films
2020s English-language films
British romantic drama films
Films about interracial romance
Films about racism in the United Kingdom
Films about schizophrenia
Films directed by Sam Mendes
Films scored by Atticus Ross
Films scored by Trent Reznor
Films set in 1980
 Films set in the 1980s
Films set in Kent
Films set in a movie theatre
Films shot in Kent
Searchlight Pictures films